A list of animated television series first aired in 2009.

See also
 List of animated feature films of 2009
 List of Japanese animation television series of 2009

References

Television series
Animated series
2009
2009
2009-related lists